Sterling Township is a township in Hodgeman County, Kansas, USA.  As of the 2000 census, its population was 144.

Geography

The streams of Rock Creek and White Woman Creek run through this township. According to the USGS, there is one church and one cemetery, St. Mary's. St. Mary's Parish was dissolved in 1997 and was placed on the National Register of Historic Places in 2016.

References

External links
 US-Counties.com
 City-Data.com

Townships in Hodgeman County, Kansas
Townships in Kansas